Vitalii Mihailov (born 15 July 1976) is a Moldovan judoka.

Achievements

See also
European Judo Championships
History of martial arts
List of judo techniques
List of judoka
Martial arts timeline

References

External links

1976 births
Living people
Moldovan male judoka
Place of birth missing (living people)
21st-century Moldovan people